-Tyrosine or tyrosine (symbol Tyr or Y) or 4-hydroxyphenylalanine is one of the 20 standard amino acids that are used by cells to synthesize proteins. It is a non-essential amino acid with a polar side group. The word "tyrosine" is from the Greek tyrós, meaning cheese, as it was first discovered in 1846 by German chemist Justus von Liebig in the protein casein from cheese. It is called tyrosyl when referred to as a functional group or side chain. While tyrosine is generally classified as a hydrophobic amino acid, it is more hydrophilic than phenylalanine. It is encoded by the codons UAC and UAU in messenger RNA.

Functions
Aside from being a proteinogenic amino acid, tyrosine has a special role by virtue of the phenol functionality.  It occurs in proteins that are part of signal transduction processes and functions as a receiver of phosphate groups that are transferred by way of protein kinases.  Phosphorylation of the hydroxyl group can change the activity of the target protein, or may form part of a signaling cascade via SH2 domain binding.

A tyrosine residue also plays an important role in photosynthesis. In chloroplasts (photosystem II), it acts as an electron donor in the reduction of oxidized chlorophyll.  In this process, it loses the hydrogen atom of its phenolic OH-group.  This radical is subsequently reduced in the photosystem II by the four core manganese clusters.

Dietary requirements and sources
The Dietary Reference Intake for tyrosine is usually estimated together with phenylalanine. It varies depending on an estimate method, however the ideal proportion of these two amino acids is considered to be 60:40 (phenylalanine:tyrosine) as a human body has such composition.
Tyrosine, which can also be synthesized in the body from phenylalanine, is found in many high-protein food products such as chicken, turkey, fish, milk, yogurt, cottage cheese, cheese, peanuts, almonds, pumpkin seeds, sesame seeds, soy products and lima beans, but also in avocados and bananas. For example, the white of an egg has about 250 mg per egg, while lean beef, lamb, pork, salmon, chicken, and turkey contain about 1 g per  portion.

Biosynthesis 

In plants and most microorganisms, tyrosine is produced via prephenate, an intermediate on the shikimate pathway.  Prephenate is oxidatively decarboxylated with retention of the hydroxyl group to give p-hydroxyphenylpyruvate, which is transaminated using glutamate as the nitrogen source to give tyrosine and α-ketoglutarate.

Mammals synthesize tyrosine from the essential amino acid phenylalanine (Phe), which is derived from food.  The conversion of Phe to Tyr is catalyzed by the enzyme phenylalanine hydroxylase, a monooxygenase.  This enzyme catalyzes the reaction causing the addition of a hydroxyl group to the end of the 6-carbon aromatic ring of phenylalanine, such that it becomes tyrosine.

Metabolism

Phosphorylation and sulfation 
Some of the tyrosine residues can be tagged (at the hydroxyl group) with a phosphate group (phosphorylated) by protein kinases. In its phosphorylated form, tyrosine is called phosphotyrosine. Tyrosine phosphorylation is considered to be one of the key steps in signal transduction and regulation of enzymatic activity.  Phosphotyrosine can be detected through specific antibodies.  Tyrosine residues may also be modified by the addition of a sulfate group, a process known as tyrosine sulfation.  Tyrosine sulfation is catalyzed by tyrosylprotein sulfotransferase (TPST).  Like the phosphotyrosine antibodies mentioned above, antibodies have recently been described that specifically detect sulfotyrosine.

Precursor to neurotransmitters and hormones
In dopaminergic cells in the brain, tyrosine is converted to L-DOPA by the enzyme tyrosine hydroxylase (TH).  TH is the rate-limiting enzyme involved in the synthesis of the neurotransmitter dopamine. Dopamine can then be converted into other catecholamines, such as norepinephrine (noradrenaline) and epinephrine (adrenaline).

The thyroid hormones triiodothyronine (T3) and thyroxine (T4) in the colloid of the thyroid are also derived from tyrosine.

Precursor to alkaloids
The latex of Papaver somniferum, the opium poppy, has been shown to convert tyrosine into the alkaloid morphine and the bio-synthetic pathway has been established from tyrosine to morphine by using Carbon-14 radio-labelled tyrosine to trace the in-vivo synthetic route.

Precursor to natural phenols 
Tyrosine ammonia lyase (TAL) is an enzyme in the natural phenols biosynthesis pathway. It transforms L-tyrosine into p-coumaric acid.

Precursor to pigments 
Tyrosine is also the precursor to the pigment melanin.

Role in coenzyme Q10 synthesis 
Tyrosine (or its precursor phenylalanine) is needed to synthesize the benzoquinone structure which forms part of coenzyme Q10.

Degradation 

The decomposition of L-tyrosine (syn. para-hydroxyphenylalanine) begins with an α-ketoglutarate dependent transamination through the tyrosine transaminase to para-hydroxyphenylpyruvate.  The positional description para, abbreviated p, mean that the hydroxyl group and side chain on the phenyl ring are across from each other (see the illustration below).
 
The next oxidation step catalyzes by p-hydroxyphenylpyruvate dioxygenase and splitting off CO2 homogentisate (2,5-dihydroxyphenyl-1-acetate).  In order to split the aromatic ring of homogentisate, a further dioxygenase, homogentisate 1,2-dioxygenase is required.  Thereby, through the incorporation of a further O2 molecule, maleylacetoacetate is created.
   
Fumarylacetoacetate is created by maleylacetoacetate cis-trans-isomerase through rotation of the carboxyl group created from the hydroxyl group via oxidation.  This cis-trans-isomerase contains glutathione as a coenzyme.  Fumarylacetoacetate is finally split by the enzyme fumarylacetoacetate hydrolase through the addition of a water molecule.

Thereby fumarate (also a metabolite of the citric acid cycle) and acetoacetate (3-ketobutyroate) are liberated.  Acetoacetate is a ketone body, which is activated with succinyl-CoA, and thereafter it can be converted into acetyl-CoA, which in turn can be oxidized by the citric acid cycle or be used for fatty acid synthesis.

Phloretic acid is also a urinary metabolite of tyrosine in rats.

Ortho- and meta-tyrosine

Three structural isomers of L-tyrosine are known. The m-tyr and o-tyr isomers, which are rare, arise through non-enzymatic free-radical hydroxylation of phenylalanine under conditions of oxidative stress.

m-Tyrosine and analogues (rare in nature but available synthetically) have shown application in Parkinson's disease, Alzheimer's disease and arthritis.

Medical use

Tyrosine is a precursor to neurotransmitters and increases plasma neurotransmitter levels (particularly dopamine and norepinephrine), but has little if any effect on mood in normal subjects. A number of studies have found tyrosine is useful during stress, cold, fatigue (in mice), prolonged work and sleep deprivation, with reductions in stress hormone levels, reductions in stress-induced weight loss seen in animal trials, and improvements in cognitive and physical performance seen in human trials.

Tyrosine does not seem to have any significant effect on cognitive or physical performance in normal circumstances, but does help sustain working memory better during multitasking.

Interactions
It is unknown if MAOIs interact with tyrosine.

Industrial synthesis
L-tyrosine and its derivatives (L-DOPA, melanin, phenylpropanoids, and others) are used in pharmaceuticals, dietary supplements, and food additives. Two methods were formerly used to manufacture L-tyrosine. The first involves the extraction of the desired amino acid from protein hydrolysates using a chemical approach. The second utilizes enzymatic synthesis from phenolics, pyruvate, and ammonia through the use of tyrosine phenol-lyase. Advances in genetic engineering and the advent of industrial fermentation have shifted the synthesis of L-tyrosine to the use of engineered strains of E. coli.

See also 
 Albinism
 Alkaptonuria
 Betalain
 Iodinated tyrosine derivatives
 Pauly reaction
 Tyramine
 Tyrosine sulfation
 Tyrosinemia

References

External links 
 Tyrosine MS Spectrum
Tyrosine metabolism 
Phenylalanine and tyrosine biosynthesis
Phenylalanine, Tyrosine, and tryptophan biosynthesis
 

Proteinogenic amino acids
Glucogenic amino acids
Ketogenic amino acids
Aromatic amino acids
Phenols
Dopamine agonists
Carbonic anhydrase activators
Monoamine precursors